Emoda is a genus of land snails with an operculum, terrestrial gastropod mollusks in the family Helicinidae.

Species 
Species within the genus Emoda include:
 Emoda bayamensis (Poey, 1854)
 Emoda bermudezi Aguayo & Jaume, 1954
 Emoda blanesi Clench & Aguayo in Aguayo, 1953
 Emoda briarea (Poey, 1851)
 Emoda caledoniensis Clench & Jacobson, 1971
 Emoda ciliata (Poey, 1852)
 Emoda clementis Clench & Aguayo, 1950
 Emoda emoda (Pfeiffer, 1865)
 Emoda mayarina (Poey, 1854)
 Emoda najazaensis Aguayo & Jaume, 1954
 Emoda pulcherrima (Lea, 1834)
 Emoda sagraiana (d’Orbigny, 1842)
 Emoda silacea (Morelet, 1849)
 Emoda submarginata (Gray, 1824)

References 

Helicinidae